McCrilliss Nunatak is a nunatak marking the north end of the Gierloff Nunataks on the north side of the Wisconsin Range, Horlick Mountains, Antarctica. It was mapped by the United States Geological Survey from surveys and U.S. Navy air photos, 1960–64, and was named by the Advisory Committee on Antarctic Names for construction electrician Harold L. McCrilliss, a member of the winter parties at Byrd Station in 1959 and South Pole Station in 1964.

References

Nunataks of Wilkes Land